Birger Andersson may refer to:

 Birger Andersson (tennis) (born 1951), Swedish tennis player
 Birger Andersson (rower) (1925–2004), Finnish rower